Energy Innsbruck is a private radio station of Innsbruck, broadcasting from Vienna. The station is part from the NRJ GROUP. The station broadcasts to Innsbruck and its surroundings at the Frequency 99,9 MHz  from 22 September 2008 and at the  Frequencies 107.7 MHz and 93.6 MHz since October 2013. NRJ is known internationally as a youth radio station.

Frequencies 
 Innsbruck 99.9 MHz, 107.7 MHz
 Schönberg im Stubaital: 99.9 MHz
 Inzing: 107.7 MHz
 Wattens: 93.6 MHz
 Telfs 107.7 MHz
 Seefeld in Tirol 107.7 MHz
 Schwaz 93.6 MHz
 Jenbach 93.6 MHz
 Hall in Tirol 99.9 MHz , 93.6 MHz
 Rum 99.9 MHz, 107.7 MHz
 Zirl 107.7 MHz

Transmission towers from Energy Innsbruck   
 Innsbruck-Schlotthof: 99.9 MHz (INNSBRUCK6)
 Inzing-Stiegelreith: 107.7 MHz 
 Wattens: 93.6 MHz

Program 
The program is similar to that of the parent station "Energy Wien", including:
 ENERGY Kickstart: Weekdays 5am to 6:45am with Mario Polszter.
 ENERGY Morgenshow: Weekdays 6:45am to 10am with Flo Berger and Matthias Hobiger.
 ENERGY am Vormittag: Weekdays 10am to 2pm with David Schindelböck.
 ENERGY am Wochenende: Saturdays 10am to 4pm with Leni Spitzer.
 ENERGY EuroHot 30: Saturdays 4pm to 6pm with Leni Spitzer.
 ENERGY am Nachmittag: Weekdays 2pm to 7pm with Mario Polszter.
 ENERGY Clubcharts: Fridays 7pm to 9pm with Leni Spitzer.
 ENERGY Clubfiles: Saturdays 8pm to 9pm with Flip Capella.
 ENERGY Mastermix: Nightly 9pm to 11pm with various high-profile DJs.

Every 30 minutes local news is given for the region of Tirol.

Radio stations in Austria
Radio stations established in 2008
2008 establishments in Austria
Mass media in Innsbruck